Skrea IF is a Swedish football club located in Skrea, Falkenberg Municipality.

Background
Skrea IF currently plays in Division 4 Halland Elit which is the sixth tier of Swedish football. They play their home matches at the Skrea IP in Falkenberg.

The club is affiliated to Hallands Fotbollförbund.

Season to season

Footnotes

External links
 Skrea IF – Official website
 Skrea IF on Facebook

Football clubs in Halland County
Association football clubs established in 1931
1931 establishments in Sweden